The 1908–09 season was the sixteenth season in which Dundee competed at a Scottish national level, playing in Division One, where they would finish in 2nd place. In a very tight race which would go down to the final day, Dundee were pipped to the title by Celtic by just a single point. Dundee would also compete in the Scottish Cup, where they would lose to Rangers in the second round. Striker John "Sailor" Hunter would finish the season as Scotland's top scorer with 29 goals in the league, and 32 in all major competitions.

Scottish Division One 

Statistics provided by Dee Archive

League table

Scottish Cup 

Statistics provided by Dee Archive

Player Statistics 
Statistics provided by Dee Archive

|}

See also 

 List of Dundee F.C. seasons

References 

 

Dundee F.C. seasons
Dundee